January 21 - Eastern Orthodox liturgical calendar - January 23

All fixed commemorations below are observed on February 4 by Eastern Orthodox Churches on the Old Calendar.

For January 22nd, Orthodox Churches on the Old Calendar commemorate the Saints listed on January 9.

Saints
 Apostle Timothy, of the Seventy Apostles (ca. 96)
 Monk-martyr Anastasius the Persian (628)
 Martyrs of Adrianople

Pre-Schism Western saints
 Hieromartyr Vincent the Deacon (Vincent of Saragossa), in Valencia under Diocletian (304)
 Martyrs Vincent, Orontius, and Victor, near Girona in Catalonia, Spain (305)
 Saint Vincent of Digne, Bishop of Digne in France (380)
 Saint Blaesilla, a daughter of St Paula (383)
 Saint Gaudentius of Novara, Bishop of Novara and Confessor (417)
 Saint Wendreda, Virgin of March, Cambridgeshire (7th century)
 Saint Dominic of Sora, founder of several monasteries - at Scandrilia, Sora, Sangro, and elsewhere, renowned for miracles (1031)
 Saint Brithwald (Bertwald of Ramsbury), Bishop of Ramsbury (1045)

Post-Schism Orthodox saints
 Venerable Martyr Anastasius the Deacon of the Kiev Caves Monastery (12th century)
 Venerable Joseph Samakus the Sanctified, of Crete (1511)
 Venerable Macarius, Abbot of Zhabyn (Belev) (1623)
 Saint Ioasaph (Bolotov), Enlightener of Alaska and the American land (1799)

New martyrs and confessors
 New Martyr Gregory of Peć (17th-18th centuries)
 New Hieromartyrs John, Nicholas, Jacob, Peter, John, John (1938)
 New Hieromartyrs John Uspensky and Euthymius Tikhonravov, Priests (1938)

Other commemorations
 Finding of the Holy Icon of "Panagia Eleistria" in Koroni, Messenia (1897)

Icon gallery

Notes

References

Sources
 January 22 / February 4. Orthodox Calendar (PRAVOSLAVIE.RU).
 February 4 / January 22. HOLY TRINITY RUSSIAN ORTHODOX CHURCH (A parish of the Patriarchate of Moscow).
 January 22. OCA - The Lives of the Saints.
 The Autonomous Orthodox Metropolia of Western Europe and the Americas (ROCOR). St. Hilarion Calendar of Saints for the year of our Lord 2004. St. Hilarion Press (Austin, TX). p. 9.
 January 22. Latin Saints of the Orthodox Patriarchate of Rome.
 The Roman Martyrology. Transl. by the Archbishop of Baltimore. Last Edition, According to the Copy Printed at Rome in 1914. Revised Edition, with the Imprimatur of His Eminence Cardinal Gibbons. Baltimore: John Murphy Company, 1916. pp. 22–23.
 Rev. Richard Stanton. A Menology of England and Wales, or, Brief Memorials of the Ancient British and English Saints Arranged According to the Calendar, Together with the Martyrs of the 16th and 17th Centuries. London: Burns & Oates, 1892. pp. 31–32.
Greek Sources
 Great Synaxaristes:  22 ΙΑΝΟΥΑΡΙΟΥ. ΜΕΓΑΣ ΣΥΝΑΞΑΡΙΣΤΗΣ.
  Συναξαριστής. 22 Ιανουαρίου. ECCLESIA.GR. (H ΕΚΚΛΗΣΙΑ ΤΗΣ ΕΛΛΑΔΟΣ). 
Russian Sources
  4 февраля (22 января). Православная Энциклопедия под редакцией Патриарха Московского и всея Руси Кирилла (электронная версия). (Orthodox Encyclopedia - Pravenc.ru).
  22 января (ст.ст.) 4 февраля 2013 (нов. ст.). Русская Православная Церковь Отдел внешних церковных связей. (DECR).

January in the Eastern Orthodox calendar